The following is a list of stadiums in India. Due to differences often arising between the planning and implementation stages for infrastructure in India, the list has been now divided into currently existing stadiums and future grounds.

Current grounds

Future projects
This list includes stadiums that are currently under construction or those still in planning stages. A few grounds from this list may be removed or scrapped completely in the planning stage itself.

See also
 List of cricket grounds in India

 List of field hockey venues in India
 List of international cricket grounds in India
 Venues of the 2010 Commonwealth Games

References

External links
 Football Stadiums in India
 Sangamnersports.8m.com
 India.cricketworld4u.com

India